Paradise Beach is a 2019 French action thriller film directed and co-written by Xavier Durringer. In the film, a thief released from prison goes to Thailand to meet up with his now retired accomplices and demand his share of money. The film was released in France on 20 February 2019.

Cast

References

External links
 
 

2019 films
2019 action thriller films
Films set in Thailand
French action thriller films
2010s French-language films
Films directed by Xavier Durringer
2010s French films